AstroFire is a multidirectional shooter for MS-DOS, published by British studio ORT Software in 1994. The game is a clone of the 1979 Asteroids arcade video game.

References

1994 video games
DOS games
Multidirectional shooters
Multiplayer and single-player video games
Video game clones
Video games developed in the United Kingdom